Edwardian musical comedy was a form of British musical theatre that extended beyond the reign of King Edward VII in both directions, beginning in the early 1890s, when the Gilbert and Sullivan operas' dominance had ended, until the rise of the American musicals by Jerome Kern, Rodgers and Hart, George Gershwin and Cole Porter following the First World War.

Between In Town in 1892 and The Maid of the Mountains, premiering in 1917, this new style of musical theatre became dominant on the musical stage in Britain and the rest of the English-speaking world. The popularity of In Town and A Gaiety Girl (1893), led to an astonishing number of hits over the next three decades, the most successful of which included The Shop Girl (1894), The Geisha (1896), Florodora (1899), A Chinese Honeymoon (1901), The Earl and the Girl (1903), The Arcadians (1909), Our Miss Gibbs (1909), The Quaker Girl (1910), Betty (1914), Chu Chin Chow (1916) and The Maid of the Mountains (1917).

History
Edwardian musical comedy began in the last decade of the Victorian era and captured the optimism, energy and good humour of the new century and the Edwardian era, as well as providing comfort during the First World War. The Gaiety Theatre's well-loved but racy burlesques were coming to the end of their popularity, and so was the run of phenomenally successful family-friendly Gilbert and Sullivan operas. These two genres had dominated the musical stage since the 1870s. A few lighter, more romantic comic operas, beginning with Dorothy (1886) found success and showed that audiences wanted something lighter than operetta, but more coherent in construction than burlesque, that featured the modern fashions and culture of the day.

George Edwardes

The father of the Edwardian musical was George 'The Guv'nor' Edwardes. He took over the Gaiety Theatre in the 1880s and, at first, improved the quality of the old Gaiety Theatre burlesques. Perceiving that their time had passed, he experimented with a modern-dress, family-friendly musical theatre style, with breezy, popular songs, snappy, romantic banter, and stylish spectacle. These drew on the traditions of Savoy opera and also used elements of burlesque and of Americans Harrigan and Hart. Their plots were simple, and they included elaborate displays of contemporary fashion and settings, and lighthearted parody of modern social convention and topical issues. He replaced the bawdy women of burlesque with his "respectable" corps of dancing, singing Gaiety Girls who wore the latest fashions, and also showed off their bodies in chorus lines and bathing attire, as well as singing, to complete the musical and visual fun. These shows were immediately widely copied at other London theatres and then in America.

The first Edwardian musical comedy was In Town in 1892. Its success, together with the even greater sensation of A Gaiety Girl in 1893, confirmed Edwardes on the path he was taking. These "musical comedies", as he called them, revolutionized the London stage and set the tone for the next three decades. According to musical theatre writer Andrew Lamb, "The British Empire and America began to fall for the appeal of the [Edwardian] musical comedy from the time when A Gaiety Girl was taken on a world tour in 1894."

Edwardes' early Gaiety hits included a series of light, romantic "poor maiden loves aristocrat and wins him against all odds" shows, usually with the word "Girl" in the title. After A Gaiety Girl came The Shop Girl (1894), The Circus Girl (1896) and A Runaway Girl (1898). The heroines were independent young women who often earned their own livings. The stories followed a familiar plot line – a chorus girl breaks into high society, a shop girl makes a good marriage. There was always a misunderstanding during act one and an engagement at the end. In the words of a contemporary review, Edwardes’ musicals were "Light, bright and enjoyable." Later Gaiety Theatre "girl" musicals included The Orchid (1903), The Spring Chicken (1905), The Girls of Gottenberg (1907), Our Miss Gibbs (1909), The Sunshine Girl (1912) and The Girl on the Film (1913). Perhaps to balance the "girl" musicals, the Gaiety also presented a series of what could be described as "boy" musicals, such as The Messenger Boy (1900), The Toreador (1901), The New Aladdin (1906) and Theodore and Co. (1916). Edwardes expanded his empire to other theatres and presented slightly more complex comedy hits beginning with An Artist's Model (1895). The Geisha (1896) and San Toy (1899) each ran for more than two years and found great international success, capitalizing on the British craze for all things oriental. Other Edwardes hits included The Girl from Kays (1902), The Earl and the Girl (1903) and The Quaker Girl (1910).

Composers, writers, producers and stars

The chief glories of Edwardian musical comedies lie in their musical scores. At their best, these combined the delicacy and sophistication of operetta with the robust tunefulness of the music hall. The major composers of the genre were Sidney Jones (The Geisha), Ivan Caryll (Our Miss Gibbs), Lionel Monckton (The Quaker Girl), Howard Talbot (A Chinese Honeymoon), Leslie Stuart (Florodora) and Paul Rubens (Miss Hook of Holland). Scores were constantly refreshed with "additional" or "specialty" numbers and re-arranged, often by several different composers and lyricists, to keep audiences coming back. Important writers included Adrian Ross, Harry Greenbank, Percy Greenbank, Owen Hall, Charles H. Taylor and Oscar Asche. Generally, the book, lyrics and music were each written by different people, which was a first for the musical stage, although now this is the usual way of doing things. Adrian Ross wrote the lyrics for well over 50 Edwardian musicals.

Besides Edwardes, American producer Charles Frohman and actor-managers like Seymour Hicks, Robert Evett and George Grossmith, Jr. were responsible for many of these shows. The musicals were frequently built around a resident company of artists, and the greatest stars of the era included actresses Marie Tempest, Gertie Millar, Lily Elsie, Ellaline Terriss and Phyllis Dare, leading men such as Hayden Coffin and Harry Grattan, and comics such as Rutland Barrington, George Grossmith, Jr., Huntley Wright and Edmund Payne. One critic wrote of Joseph Coyne that, like other stars of musical comedy, "It is no good their pretending to be any one else. We go to see themselves, and all we ask is that the authors and others shall give them every chance of being themselves in the most pronounced and personal fashion".

Examples
The Arcadians is generally regarded as the masterpiece of the genre. The composers were Monckton and Talbot, both at the height of their powers. The story, about the havoc wreaked when truth-telling Arcadians arrive in corrupt London, neatly parallels the position of Edwardian musical comedies in theatrical history, with operetta-singing Arcadians, representing the past, meeting with music hall-singing Londoners, representing the future. This is an example of a common feature of shows of this period: sophistication with a common touch.

Florodora (1899) by Leslie Stuart and Paul Rubens made a splash on both sides of the Atlantic, as did A Chinese Honeymoon (1901), by British lyricist George Dance and American-born composer Howard Talbot, which ran for a record setting 1,074 performances in London and 376 in New York. The story concerns couples who honeymoon in China and inadvertently break the kissing laws (shades of The Mikado). Later enormously popular hits included Chu Chin Chow (1916), which ran for 2,238 performances (more than twice as many as any previous musical), Theodore & Co (1916), The Boy (1917), Yes, Uncle! (1917) and The Maid of the Mountains (1917, the second longest-running Edwardian musical, with 1,352 performances). Audiences wanted light and uplifting entertainment during the war, and these shows delivered it.

George M. Cohan's sentimental Little Nellie Kelly (1922) was considered a late example of Edwardian musical comedy.

Media

References

Bibliography
Charlton, Fraser. Article on the rise of Edwardian musical comedy
Description of Edwardes' musicals at PeoplePlayUK.org
Kenrick, John. Info about American productions at Musicals101.com, The Cyber Encyclopedia of Musical Theatre, Films and Television
Description of books about Edwardian musicals and people associated with them at Hobbyist.co.uk
Wearing, J. P. The London Stage, 1910–1919: A Calendar of Players and Plays, Scarecrow Press (1982)

External links
British Musical Theatre – biographies, synopses and MIDI files
Stage Beauty – Extensive information about female stars from Edwardian musical theatre
British musical theatre publication The Gaiety and related publications, available articles
British musicals and light opera site, MIDI files, cast lists, and usually also lyrics, of approximately 200 musicals
Synopses, libretti and MIDI files of Edwardian Musical Comedies

Musical theatre
Victorian culture
Edwardian era